Anthony Rubén Lozano Colón (born 25 April 1993), also known as Choco, is a Honduran professional footballer who plays as a forward for La Liga club Cádiz and the Honduras national team.

Club career
Born in Yoro, Lozano made his debut in the Liga Nacional de Fútbol Profesional de Honduras at the age of only 15, appearing for C.D. Olimpia against Club Deportivo y Social Vida on 11 January 2009. On 21 February 2010 he scored his first goals, netting a hat-trick in the Clausura tournament 6–0 win over C.D. Victoria.

In August 2010, Lozano spent time training with Tottenham Hotspur's reserve team, impressing manager Harry Redknapp. He was expected to stay with the North London side, but the deal never went through because he was underage and, therefore, could not sign a contract with a professional club.

On 11 August 2011, Lozano moved to Spain and signed with Valencia CF on a one-year loan, but was immediately loaned to CD Alcoyano in the same community, in Segunda División. He made his official debut against UD Las Palmas on 3 September, as a second-half substitute (1–0 away loss).

Lozano spent the 2012–13 season with Valencia's reserves, in Segunda División B. After being released, he returned to his first club Olimpia.

Lozano was Olimpia's top scorer in the 2014–15 campaign, contributing 26 goals in 38 matches. On 6 August 2015, he returned to Spain and its second division after agreeing to a one-year loan deal with CD Tenerife, which was extended on 9 July of the following year; he was awarded the Player of the Month award for May, after helping his team reach the play-offs.

On 7 July 2017, an agreement between FC Barcelona and Olimpia for Lozano was confirmed by the latter club's vice president Osman Madrid, which saw the player become the first Honduran to represent the Catalans. He was assigned to their reserves in division two, and in the first game of the season, he scored once and provided an assist against Real Valladolid (2–1, away).

On 30 January 2018, Lozano joined La Liga side Girona FC for a fee of €1.7 million. He made his debut in the competition 12 days later, featuring 21 minutes in the 1–0 away loss to Sevilla FC, and scored his first goal on 3 March – also from the bench – to help the visitors defeat Villarreal CF 2–0.

Lozano was given a direct red card late into the 2–1 home win over Rayo Vallecano on 27 October 2018, after tackling Santi Comesaña from behind. He scored the equaliser against Atlético Madrid the following 9 January, cancelling out Antoine Griezmann's earlier goal in a 1–1 draw in the first leg of the Copa del Rey round of 16 tie at the Estadi Montilivi; it was his second competitive goal for the club, after failing to the find the net for almost a year. He once again scored in the cup when Girona faced Real Madrid in the quarter-finals, in the process becoming the fourth player from his country to achieve the feat against that opposition.

On 1 September 2019, Lozano was loaned to Cádiz CF of the Spanish second tier for one year. He scored his first goal for the team late in the same month, in a 2–1 away win against UD Almería. He added a further nine until the end of the campaign – second-best in the squad behind Álex Fernández's 13 – as his team returned to the top flight after 14 years.

Cádiz exercised their option to buy on 22 July 2020, and Lozano signed a permanent three-year contract. On 17 October, he scored the only goal in a victory over Real Madrid at the Alfredo Di Stéfano Stadium, the first ever away against that adversary.

Lozano scored his first hat-trick in the Spanish first division on 26 October 2021, in a 3–3 draw at Villarreal.

International career
Lozano scored 11 goals for the Honduras under-17s, including four in the 2009 CONCACAF Championship which qualified the national team to that year's FIFA U-17 World Cup, where he netted in the 3–1 loss against Germany. He made his senior debut in August 2011, coming on as a substitute for Carlo Costly (who scored both goals in the 2–0 win) in a friendly win over Venezuela.

Lozano also represented the country at the 2012 and 2016 Summer Olympics. He scored twice in the latter tournament, helping the nation to the semi-finals in Brazil.

Personal life
Lozano's half-brother, Luis Ramos, is also a footballer. A midfielder, he played several years in Slovakia and Hungary. His style was compared to compatriot Costly. 

Lozano married Alessa Gámez, with the couple later welcoming a daughter.

Career statistics

Club

International

Scores and results list Honduras' goal tally first, score column indicates score after each Lozano goal.

References

External links

1993 births
Living people
People from Yoro Department
Honduran footballers
Association football forwards
Liga Nacional de Fútbol Profesional de Honduras players
C.D. Olimpia players
La Liga players
Segunda División players
Segunda División B players
CD Alcoyano footballers
Valencia CF Mestalla footballers
CD Tenerife players
FC Barcelona Atlètic players
Girona FC players
Cádiz CF players
Honduras youth international footballers
Honduras under-20 international footballers
Honduras international footballers
2014 Copa Centroamericana players
2015 CONCACAF Gold Cup players
2017 CONCACAF Gold Cup players
2019 CONCACAF Gold Cup players
2009 CONCACAF U-20 Championship players
Footballers at the 2012 Summer Olympics
Footballers at the 2016 Summer Olympics
Olympic footballers of Honduras
Honduran expatriate footballers
Expatriate footballers in Spain
Honduran expatriate sportspeople in Spain